Thomas Fabri (c. 1380 – c. 1420) was a composer from the Southern Netherlands (Flanders), who worked during the early 15th century.

Biography 
Fabri was a student of Jean de Noyers alias Tapissier in Paris and of Johannes Ecghaert in Brugge (Bruges), at least if we may believe the partition of his 'Gloria', where he is described as 'scolaris Tapissier'. Fabri became choir master at the Saint Donatien Church (Sint-Donatiuskerk) in Brugge in 1412.

Only four of his works have been preserved in foreign sources. Two works are settings in three parts on Dutch lyrics. They may have been written down by a German in a song book (perhaps at the Council of Constance) that has been illustrated by an Italian and is kept now in the Abbey of Heiligenkreuz.

Works 
Ach vlaendere vrie (rondeau)
Die mey so lieflic wol ghebloit (ballade)
Gloria (Bologna, Civico Museo Bibliografico Musicale, Ms Q)
Sinceram salutem care mando vobis (antiphone)

Discography 
 Direct link to the search results for 'Thomas Fabri' on www.medieval.org
 1996 - Oh Flanders Free. Music of the Flemish Renaissance: Ockeghem, Josquin, Susato, De la Rue. Capilla Flamenca. Alamire LUB 03, Naxos 8.554516. Contains a recording of "Ach Vlaendre vrie" by Thomas Fabri.
 2009 - En un gardin. Les quatre saisons de l'Ars Nova. Manuscrits de Stavelot, Mons, Utrecht, Leiden. Capilla Flamenca. MEW 0852. Contains a recording of "Sinceram salutem care" by Thomas Fabri.
 2013 -   songs in Dutch, Fortuna, Aliud APCD BE 004-2. Contains all the secular works.

Sources
 Site of the La Trobe University

1380 births
1420 deaths
15th-century composers
Dutch classical composers
Dutch male classical composers
Flemish composers